Brackenthwaite is a settlement and former civil parish in Lake District of England. In 1931 the parish had a population of 89. 

For administrative purposes, Brackenthwaite lies within the civil parish of Buttermere, the district of Allerdale, and the county of Cumbria. It is within the Copeland constituency of the United Kingdom Parliament. Prior to Brexit in 2020, it was part of the North West England constituency of the European Parliament.

History 
Bracanethuaite 12th Century.

Old Norse brakni 'bush' and thveit 'assart' (cf. thwaite) like Bregentved (Denmark) and Bracquetuit (Normandy) (cf. Thuit).

Brackenthwaite was formerly a township in Lorton chapelry, from 1866 Brackenthwaite was a civil parish in its own right until it was abolished on 1 April 1934 and merged with Buttermere.

See also

Listed buildings in Buttermere, Cumbria

External links
  Cumbria County History Trust: Brackenthwaite (nb: provisional research only - see Talk page)

References 

Villages in Cumbria
Former civil parishes in Cumbria
Buttermere, Cumbria (village)